Olympic Star Muyinga Football Club, commonly referred to as Olympic Star de Muyinga or simply as Olympic Star is a professional football club based in Muyinga, Burundi. The team currently plays in Ligue A, the top division of Burundi football.

History 
It was founded in 1997 in the city of Muyinga and played for the first time in the top-flight of the Burundian football in 2005, after the introduction of the sixteen-team format. A year earlier, she had created a sensation by reaching the final of the Coupe de l'Unité, lost against Muzinga (0–3).

Relegated at the end of the 2009 season, Olympic returned to the top tier, winning Group B of the Second Division in the 2013–14 season.

The club managed to win the Coupe du Président de la République in the 2016–17 season, beating Le Messager Ngozi in the final 2–1 in extra time, with a goal by Slim Saidi in the 98 minute. 

The first appearance in an international tournament was in the 2018 season of the CAF Confederation Cup. There they faced in the preliminary round the Burkinabé club Étoile Filante, and after a 0–0 draw in the 1st leg, they won 1–0 at Ouagadougou in 2nd leg, qualifying in the first round where they were eliminated by Al-Hilal Al-Ubayyid from Sudan, 0–0 at Urukundo Stadium in Ngozi and 0–6 at El Obeid.

Honours 
Coupe du Président de la République
Winners (1): 2017

Performance in CAF competitions

Current team

References

External links
Soccerway

Football clubs in Burundi